
Year 484 BC was a year of the pre-Julian Roman calendar. At the time, it was known as the Year of the Consulship of Mamercus and Vibulanus (or, less frequently, year 270 Ab urbe condita). The denomination 484 BC for this year has been used since the early medieval period, when the Anno Domini calendar era became the prevalent method in Europe for naming years.

Events 
 By place 

 Persian Empire 
 Xerxes I quells the Egyptian revolt against Persian rule. He ravages the Delta region in the process and then appoints his brother Achaemenes satrap (governor) of Egypt.
 Despite an attempt at rebellion, the land and city of Babylon remains solidly under Persian rule.

 Greece 
 The Athenian general and statesman, Xanthippus, is ostracised.
 Astylos of Croton wins the stadion race for a second time at the 74th Olympic Games.

 Rome 
 The Romans defeat the Volsci and Aequi in battle.
 Dedication of the Temple of Castor and Pollux

 By topic 

 Literature 
 The Athenian playwright, Aeschylus, wins first prize in drama at the Dionysia festival.

Births 
 Herodotus of Halicarnassus, Greek historian (approximate date) (died c. 425 BC)
 Achaeus of Eretria, Greek tragedian

Deaths 
 Wu Zixu, political advisor from Chu who has been employed at the court of the State of Wu during the reign of King Helü of Wu; all Chinese people with the surname Wu consider him their first ancestor (born 526 BC)
 Makkhali Gosala (according to historian Arthur Llewellyn Basham), Indian ascetic

References